The 1985 Virginia Slims of Indianapolis was a women's tennis tournament played on indoor hard courts at the Indianapolis Racquet Club in Indianapolis, Indiana in the United States and was part of the 1984 Virginia Slims World Championship Series. It was the fifth edition of the tournament and ran from March 4 through March 10, 1985. Third-seeded Kathy Horvath won the singles title.

Finals

Singles
 Kathy Horvath defeated  Elise Burgin 6–2, 6–4
 It was Horvath's 1st singles title of the year and the 4th of her career.

Doubles
 Elise Burgin /  Kathy Horvath defeated  Jennifer Mundel /  Molly Van Nostrand 6–4, 6–1

References

External links
 ITF tournament edition details
 Footage of the singles final

Virginia Slims of Indianapolis
Virginia Slims of Indianapolis
1985 in Indiana